Danville Municipal Airport  is a public use airport in Yell County, Arkansas, United States. The airport is owned by the City of Danville and located three nautical miles (6 km) northwest of its central business district. It is included in the National Plan of Integrated Airport Systems for 2011–2015, which categorized it as a general aviation facility.

Facilities and aircraft 
Danville Municipal Airport covers an area of 49 acres (20 ha) at an elevation of 387 feet (118 m) above mean sea level. It has one runway designated 11/29 with an asphalt surface measuring 5,325 by 75 feet (1,623 x 23 m).

For the 12-month period ending June 30, 2011, the airport had 3,000 general aviation aircraft operations, an average of 58 per week. At that time there were seven aircraft based at this airport: 57% single-engine and 43% multi-engine.

Since 1987, Danville Municipal Airport has received $1,482,659.85 in grant funding for improvements.

References

External links 
 Danville Municipal Airport (32A) at Arkansas Department of Aeronautics
 Aerial image as of April 2000 from USGS The National Map
 
 

Airports in Arkansas
Transportation in Yell County, Arkansas
Buildings and structures in Yell County, Arkansas